The Vallavik Tunnel is a road tunnel in Vestland county, Norway. The tunnel begins on the north edge of the village of Eide in the municipality of Voss and runs to the southeast, ending at the small farm of Vallaviki in the municipality of Ulvik. The tunnel is part of Norwegian National Road 13 and Norwegian County Road 7. The  tunnel was originally opened on 27 April 1985.

The branch passes directly over the older Djønno Tunnel.

References

Voss
Ulvik
Road tunnels in Vestland
Tunnels completed in 1985
1985 establishments in Norway